The Awaroa River is a river in the Ōtorohanga District, on the west coast of New Zealand's North Island. It flows north from its source near Te Koraha, through Hauturu to Kawhia Harbour. The river passes through both pasture and indigenous forest. Over half of the river is in forest.

The name translates to 'long river'. It is a name used by 33 other locations, including two waterways in Northland (Awaroa River and  another, rather longer, flowing into the Wairoa River), a river north of Kaiteriteri and 9 in Waikato Region (Awaroa River and 2 streams, flowing into the Waikato, one flowing into Lake Whangape, another into Lake Waahi, another stream flowing into the Piako River, 2 Awaroa Streams in Coromandel, one flowing into Kennedy Bay and a tributary of the Opitonui River).

The bridge carrying Harbour Road over the river was originally built in 1930. In 1922 a launch ran from Kawhia to Awaroa, with a coach connection to Ōtorohanga. 

Veronica scopulorum  ‘Awaroa’ is a naturally uncommon hebe, endemic to about half a dozen limestone outcrops in the head waters of the Awaroa River and northern Taumatatotara Range. It is threatened by weed invasion, forest degradation and goat and possum browse.

The estuary upstream from Uenukutuhatu Rock has mangrove, seagrass, freshwater marsh clubrush and regenerating bush, with invasive black locust trees.

Some coal was discovered in the valley in 1903, but its quality was too poor to mine.

The river was once used for navigation; in 1924 launch owners asked for willows to be removed. A 1981 report said the willows didn't hinder navigation, but launches could only go as far as the road bridge.

References

External links 

 Google  Street View from Harbour Road bridge to  Hautapu Bluff
 1907 photo of Awaroa River and Hautapu Bluff

Rivers of Waikato
Ōtorohanga District
Rivers of New Zealand